Krisztián Koller (born 8 May 1983 in Pécs) is a Hungarian football player who currently plays for Nyíregyháza Spartacus FC. He spent several years at Barcs, scoring eight goals in the 2006–07 season. Koller played for Kaposvölgye in the 2009–10 season.

References

External links
 HLSZ 
 MLSZ 

1983 births
Living people
Sportspeople from Pécs
Hungarian footballers
Association football forwards
Barcsi SC footballers
Kaposvölgye VSC footballers
Kozármisleny SE footballers
Pécsi MFC players
Nyíregyháza Spartacus FC players
Nemzeti Bajnokság I players
People from Barcs